American conservatism is a broad system of political beliefs in the United States characterized by respect for American traditions, republicanism, support for Judeo-Christian values, moral absolutism, free markets and free trade, anti-communism, individualism, advocacy of American exceptionalism, and a defense of Western culture from the threats, whether real or perceived, posed by socialism, authoritarianism, and moral relativism. The recent movement is based in the Republican Party, though some Democrats were also important figures early in the movement's history.

The following list is made up of prominent American conservatives from the public and private sectors.  The list also includes political parties, organizations and media outlets which have made a notable impact on conservatism in the United States. Entries on the list must have achieved notability after 1932, the beginning of the Fifth Party System.  Before 1932, terminology was different. Positions that are called conservative after 1932, were typically called "liberal" (ie classical liberal) before then. Likewise European liberals, such as Friedrich Hayek, were called conservatives when they came to America, which puzzled Hayek.



People

Intellectuals, writers, and activists

Politicians, office holders, and jurists

Business and religious leaders involved in conservative politics

Media personalities: publishers, editors, radio hosts, columnists and bloggers

Filmmakers and screenwriters

Novelists

Organizations

Think tanks

Foundations

Political, social and economic organizations

Media

See also
 List of American liberals
 List of Latino Republicans
 List of African-American Republicans
 List of politicians affiliated with the Tea Party movement
 List of paleoconservative organizations
 List of anti-abortion organizations in the United States

Footnotes

 
Conservatism-related lists
Lists of American people
Lists of people by ideology
United States politics-related lists